Henny van Schoonhoven (28 August 1970 – 11 September 2009) was a Dutch professional footballer.

Born in Utrecht, van Schoonhoven played for FC Utrecht, ADO Den Haag and SC Cambuur, making a total of 75 league appearances.

Van Schoonhoven died of cancer on 11 September 2009.

References

1970 births
2009 deaths
Dutch footballers
FC Utrecht players
ADO Den Haag players
Deaths from cancer in the Netherlands
Footballers from Utrecht (city)
Association football defenders